Pondicherry Gramin Bank, also known locally as  Puduvai Bharathiar Grama Bank (PBGB) is a Regional Rural Bank in the Indian Union Territory of Puducherry. It is the largest bank in Pondicherry in terms of branch network. The bank was established in the year 1980 under the Regional Rural Bank Act, 1961.

This bank is jointly owned by Government of India, Government of Puducherry and sponsored by Indian Bank. The shareholders of the Bank are Government of India (50%), Government of Puducherry (15%) and Indian Bank (35%).

Area of operations
The Bank is operating in the following four districts of Puducherry:

 Puducherry
 Karaikal
 Mahe
 Yanam

The bank has 41  branches in operation, of which eight are located in Karaikal and two in Mahe and one in Yanam.

Board of directors
 Shri D Devaraj, Chairman
 Shri E Selvasekaran
 Shri A S Pillai
 Shri Veerashankar

See also
 Pondicherry Gramin Bank
 Regional Rural Bank
 List of banks in India

References

External links
 Reserve Bank of India - About Us
 List of all Grameen Banks in India | Banks | Bank Exams Portal
 Nabard - REGIONAL RURAL BANKS

Regional rural banks of India
Companies based in Puducherry
2008 establishments in Puducherry
Indian companies established in 2008
Banks established in 2008